Pol Chomchuen (born November 28, 1959) is a Thai football coach and former footballer.

References

External links
mtufc.com

tpldb.com
goal.com

1959 births
Living people
Pol Chomchuen
Pol Chomchuen
Pol Chomchuen
Pol Chomchuen
Pol Chomchuen
Association football midfielders
Pol Chomchuen